Manetti is an Italian surname. Notable people with the surname include: 

Antonio Manetti (1423–1497), Italian mathematician and architect
Domenico Manetti (1609–1663), Italian painter
Giannozzo Manetti (1396–1459), Italian politician and diplomat
Larry Manetti (born 1947), American actor 
Ricardo Mannetti (born 1975), Namibian footballer 
Rutilio di Lorenzo Manetti, (c. 1571 – 1639), Italian painter
Saverio Manetti (1723–1785), Italian physician, botanist and ornithologist
Teresa Maria Manetti, (1846–1910), Italian Roman Catholic nun

Italian-language surnames